Clinton Township is one of fourteen townships in Cass County, Indiana, United States. As of the 2010 census, its population was 816.

History
Clinton Township was organized in 1834. It was named for DeWitt Clinton, sixth Governor of New York.

Geography

Cities and towns
 Logansport (west edge)

Unincorporated towns
 Clymers

Adjacent townships
 Noble (northeast)
 Eel (east)
 Washington (east)
 Washington Township, Carroll County (southeast)
 Liberty Township, Carroll County (southwest)
 Adams Township, Carroll County (west)
 Jefferson (northwest)

Major highways
  U.S. Route 35
  Indiana State Road 25

Cemeteries
The township contains four cemeteries: Clymers, Porter, Saint Johns and Shideler.

References
 
 United States Census Bureau cartographic boundary files

External links

Townships in Cass County, Indiana
Townships in Indiana
1834 establishments in Indiana
Populated places established in 1834